Tekin Bilge (1930 – 23 August 2016) was a Turkish footballer. He competed in the men's tournament at the 1952 Summer Olympics.

References

External links
 
 

1930 births
2016 deaths
Turkish footballers
Olympic footballers of Turkey
Footballers at the 1952 Summer Olympics
People from Afyonkarahisar
Association football midfielders
Beykozspor footballers